Marcia Pointon is a historian of British art. She trained at the University of Manchester, receiving her PhD there in 1974. From 1975, she was at the University of Sussex, becoming Professor of the History of Art in 1989. In 1992, she moved to the University of Manchester to take the Pilkington Professorship in the History of Art, a position she held until 2002. She now works as a free-lance consultant and researcher.

Writing
Pointon is a prolific author, widely recognised as one of the leading scholars of British art. She has written over fifteen books and numerous scholarly articles and reviews.  Her innovative approach to the subject emerged with her book Naked Authority: The Body in Western Painting and developed further with Hanging the Head: Portraiture and Social Formation in Eighteenth-Century England. Continuing her exploration of the semiotics of the body, Pointon published Brilliant Effects: A Cultural History of Gem Stones and Jewellery, a study of personal adornment in western culture.'Brilliant Effects' was awarded the Historians of British Art book prize in 2011 single author category post 1800 for books published 2010/2011. Her most recent book is Portrayal and the Search for Identity, Reaktion Books 2013, reviewed in Apollo Magazine July/August 2013: , p. 97' Pointon has led the field in applying theoretical discourse to the business of thinking about art, notably in the context of long eighteenth-century British culture.'

Pointon's most read work is probably History of Art: A Students' Handbook (1980) which has become an established introductory text for students beginning in art history. The book was reissued in new editions in 1986, 1993 and 1997.A fifth and substantially rewritten edition was published by Routledge March 2014.

Since 2009 Pointon has researched and published on the relationships between materials and meanings as for example in her essay Enduring Characteristics and Unstable Hues: Men in Black in French Painting in the 1860s and 1870s in Art History September 2017  and her chapter The Importance of Gems in the work of Peter Paul Rubens 1577-1640 in Ben van den Bercken and Vivian Baan, eds., Engraved Gems. From Antiquity to the Present, Leiden 2017

Selected publications

History of Art: A Students' Handbook.  Allen & Unwin, 1980 5th edn.2014 .
Naked Authority: The Body in Western Painting, Cambridge University Press 1990, out of print.
Hanging the Head: Portraiture and Social Formation in Eighteenth-Century England, Yale University Press, 2993, out of print.
Strategies for Showing: Women Possession, and representation in English Visual Culture 1665-1800, Oxford University Press, 1997 
Brilliant Effects: A Cultural History of Gem Stones and Jewellery, Yale University Press, 2009.
Portrayal and the Search for Identity
Rocks, Ice and Dirty Stones: Diamond Histories

References

British art historians
Living people
Alumni of the University of Manchester
Year of birth missing (living people)
People associated with the Courtauld Institute of Art
People educated at Ackworth School
Academics of the University of Sussex
Women art historians
British women historians